In telecommunication, a maritime broadcast communications net is a communications net that is used for international distress calling, including international lifeboat, lifecraft, and survival-craft high frequency (HF); aeronautical emergency very high frequency (VHF); survival ultra high frequency (UHF); international calling and safety very high frequency (VHF); combined scene-of-search-and-rescue; and other similar and related purposes. 

Note:  Basic international distress calling is performed at either medium frequency (MF) or at high frequency (HF).

References

See also

 500 kHz
 Distress frequency
 Global Maritime Distress Safety System

Broadcasting